The Islamist movement in Sudan started in universities and high schools as early as the 1940s under the influence of the Egyptian Muslim Brotherhood. The Islamic Liberation Movement, a precursor of the Sudanese Muslim Brotherhood, began in 1949. Hassan Al-Turabi then took control of it under the name of the Sudanese Muslim Brotherhood. In 1964, he became secretary-general of the Islamic Charter Front (ICF), an activist movement that served as the political arm of the Muslim Brotherhood.  Other Islamist groups in Sudan included the Front of the Islamic Pact and the Party of the Islamic Bloc.

As of 2011, Al-Turabi, who created the Islamist Popular Congress Party, had been the leader of Islamists in Sudan for the last half century. Al-Turabi's philosophy drew selectively from Sudanese, Islamic, and Western political thought to fashion an ideology for the pursuit of power. Al-Turabi supported sharia and the concept of an Islamic state, but his vision was not Wahhabi or Salafi. He appreciated that the majority of Sudanese followed Sufi Islam, which he set out to change with new ideas. He did not extend legitimacy to Sufis, Mahdists, and clerics, whom he saw as incapable of addressing the challenges of modern life. One of the strengths of his vision was to consider different trends in Islam. Although the political base for his ideas was probably relatively small, he had an important influence on Sudanese politics and religion.  

Following the 2019 coup in Sudan, the future of Islamism in Sudan was in question.

References